Cook's hocicudo (Oxymycterus josei) is a species of rodent in the family Cricetidae. It is found only in southern Uruguay, where it lives in wetlands, moist grasslands and scrub. The specifies is named after American zoologist Joseph “José” A. Cook.

References

Oxymycterus
Endemic fauna of Uruguay
Mammals described in 2002
Mammals of Uruguay